Udhampur is a district in the Indian Union territory of Jammu and Kashmir. The Northern Command headquarters of the Indian Army is located in the district.

Weather conditions 
Chenab, Ans, Tawi and Ujh are the main rivers. The district is rich in minerals such as coal, bauxite, gypsum and limestone.

Administration
Udhampur district comprises eight tehsils (Chenani, Ramnagar Tehsil, basantgarh, latti,Majalta and seventeen blocks, namely, dudu Basantgarh, Gordi, Chenani, Bajalta, Panchari, Ramnagar and Udhampur. Each block consists of a number of panchayats.

Demographics 

The 2011 census indicates the population of the district to be 554,985. There are 871 females for every 1000 males in the district. The overall literacy rate is 54.16%, with 66.43% for males and 39.89% for females. The majority of the population of the district practice Hinduism. The majority are Dogras in this district. There are a large number of nomadic Gujjars and Bakarwals present in the district as well.

According to the 2011 census Udhampur district has a population of 555,357, greater than that of Brunei and roughly equal to the EU nation of Luxembourg. This gives it a ranking of 538th in India (out of a total of 640). Its population growth rate over the decade 2001–2011 was 20.86%. Udhampur has a sex ratio of 870 females for every 1000 males (which varies with religion), and a literacy rate of 69.9%.

Religion

The religious composition of the district is: Hindu 88.12%, Muslim 10.77%.

Language 

At the time of the 2011 census, 81.36% of the population spoke Dogri, 5.18% Gojri, 3.67% Hindi, 2.81% Gaddi, 1.35% Pahari and 1.30% Kashmiri as their first language.

Tourist attractions 
Mansar lake: Mansar is a lake fringed by forest-covered hills, over a mile in length by half-a-mile in width. Surinsar-Mansar Lakes is designated as Ramsar Convention in November 2005. Besides being an excursion destination in the state, it is also a holy site, sharing the legend and sanctity of Lake Manasarovar. On the Eastern Bank of the Lake there is a shrine to Sheshnag, a snake with six heads.

Surinsar Lake: Surinsar Lake is surrounded by thickly wooded mountain ranges and it is a picnic spot. Surinsar Lake and Mansar Lake are considered to be twin lakes; Mansar is located 30 km away from it. The Surinsar Mansar Wildlife Sanctuary is located in the midst of both the lakes and supports 3 mammalian species and 15 avifauna species including crane. According to Hindu mythological legends, the origin of the lake is closely associated with the legendary warrior of Mahabharat, Arjun. It is said to believe that Arjun shot an arrow in to the Mansar and a spring gushed of the earth and now it is known as Surinsar Lake.

Dr. Syama Prasad Mookerjee Tunnel: It is India's longest road tunnel with a length of 9.28 km (5.8 mi). It is the first tunnel in the India with a fully integrated tunnel control system. The tunnel reduces the distance between Jammu and Srinagar by 30 km and travel time by two hours. The all-weather tunnel bypasses snowfall and avalanche prone areas in winter at places like Patnitop, Kud, and Batote that obstruct NH 44 every winter and cause long queues of vehicles - sometimes for days at length.

Shool Panishwar Mahadev Temple/ Sudhmahadev: The 2800 years old temple Sudh Mahadev also Shool Panishwar Mahadev Temple is situated in the Chenani Tehsil of District Udhampur. The Temple of Sudh Mahadev is about 50 km away from District Headquarter of Udhampur. The temple is one of the oldest Shiva Temples of Jammu & Kashmir State. Sudh Mahadev is a shrine dedicated to Lord Shiva, situated at a height of approximately 1225m. One legend associated with this shrine is as: Once, when Goddess Parvati was in deep prayer, a demon called Sudheet came to pay his respectful obeisance. But his demonic look frightened the Goddess and She made a loud shriek. Her cry revered acted across the mountains surrounding the valley. Lord Shiva was disturbed by the sound. When He opened His eyes, He saw the demon, at whom he hurled His invincible Trident (Holy Trishul). As the trident pierced through Sudheet, he began to chant Lord Shiva's name. Lord Shiva realized the mistake, so He offered to bring Sudheet back to life. But Sudheet refused to come back to life telling Lord Shiva that only by dying at His hands would he be able to obtain moksha (Salvation). Moved by the demon's words, Lord Shiva ordered that, henceforth, Sudheet's name would be taken before His own at the place where he was killed. That is how the place where Goddess Parvati used to worship a shivling came to be known as Sudhmahadev.

Krimchi temples: Krimchi is the site of one of the oldest temple complexes of the state. Believed to have been constructed in the 11th - 12th century AD, this group of temples, also locally known as the Pandava Temples. Consists of four large and three small temples dedicated to Lord Shiv. The architecture of the temples shows Greek (Hellenic) influences. As per the legends, Raja Kichak of Mahabharat was said to be the creator of town Krimchi and the Kingdom. It is also said that Pandavas while in exile remained there for a long period.

Latti: Latti is a village in Dudu Block in Udhampur District of Jammu & Kashmir UT, India. It is located 83 km towards East from District headquarters Udhampur.

Aparneshar Temple (Mantalai temple): Aparneshar Temple or Mantalai Temple at an elevation of 1450 metres from the ground, surrounded by deodar trees. This is the place where mother Parvati was born and married Lord Shiva. One divine rock (patthar) related to the wedding of Parvati and Shiva can also be spotted in this shrine. Ever since Dhirendra Brahmachari, the Yogic mentor of former Indian Prime Minister Indira Gandhi, was killed in air crash in June 1994 property worth hundreds of crore in Mantalai Aparna Asharam is gathering dust. This facility is now being developed as a state-of-the-art International Yoga Center.

Gauri Kund: Place where Parvati took bath regularly located in Sudmahadev.

Temples 

Owing to a multitude of shrines and temples, Udhampur is also known as Devika Nagari meaning City of the Goddess. Places of worship located in the district include Aparneshar Temple (Parvati Janmbhoomi), Sudh Mahadev (Shool Panishwar Mahadev), Babore Temples, Kansar Devta's shrine, Shaankari Devta mandir, Shiv Khori Cave Temple, Bhairav Ghati, Krimchi Temples, Shiv Parvathi Cave shrine, Cairhai, Mutal Pingla Devi shrine, Shri Mata Vaishno Devi shrine, Deva Mayi Maa Temple, Sheshnag Shrine

In the 7th century text, the Nilamata Purana by Nila Muni, it is mentioned that the Devika River is a manifestation of the mother Goddess Parvati to benefit people of Mader Desha that covers the areas between river Ravi and Chenab and the river Devika and appears on the Shiv Ratri. Lord Shiva and his consort Uma are believed to manifest together at eight places alongside the Devika river. The subterranean river Devika presently flows under a sandy surface.

In Devi Mahatmya it is mentioned, that there is no need to perform Japa or any ritual for obtaining spiritual benefits at this pilgrimage site, but only to touch the Devika waters or bathing in them. Water from the Devika can be retrieved by digging a foot into the sand bed. Cremation on the sands of Devika is considered as meritorious as on the banks of the Ganges at Kashi.

Important localities

Military

The Northern Command Headquarters of the Indian Army is based in Udhampur and consists of three Corps, the XIV, XV, and XVI. All units are deployed along the Line of Control in Kashmir, with the exceptions of the 39th Infantry Division, and the 2nd, 3rd, and 16th Independent Armored Brigades.

Prior to Independence, Northern Command Headquarters was located at Rawalpindi, and was responsible for the defence of North West India. After Partition, the Command Headquarters was allocated to Pakistan. In India, a new headquarters designated as Western Command was located at Shimla to look after the Northern borders with Pakistan and some portions of Tibet.

The need for a separate headquarters in the North was felt during First Kashmir War in 1948. The experience of wars in 1962, 1965 and 1971 reinforced the conviction that the Northern Theatre needed to be commanded by a headquarters at Shimla. The 1965 and 1971 Wars demonstrated that the area under General Officer Commanding-in-Chief Western Command was too vast for effective command.

Accordingly, in 1971, duplicate headquarters with duplicated staff were set up at Shimla and Bhatinda. After 1971, Headquarter Northern Command was established at Udhampur, taking over responsibility for Jammu, Kashmir and Ladakh.

It was decided in June 1972 to raise Northern Command at Udhampur, with two corps under it, to look after the defence of this region. This strength has now increased to three corps. Northern Command now controls this sensitive region of the country which covers the entire Union Territory of Jammu and Kashmir and contiguous portions of Punjab and Himachal Pradesh.

The first GOC-in-C of Northern Command was Lt Gen PS Bhagat. The command has been in the operational mode since its inception. It saw a number of high and low-intensity operations.

Troops of the Northern Command have been manning the highest battlefield in the world at the Siachen Glacier where the altitude of the posts varies from 15,000 to 23,000 ft.

This command has played a crucial role in fighting against the proxy war that began in 1990. Over 18,000 terrorists have been killed, more than 80 tons of explosives and almost 40,000 weapons have been recovered. The command also took the onus of fencing the Line of Control to curtail the levels of infiltration and exfiltration.

The XIV Corps is the field formation that is responsible for Ladakh and Kargil, and is responsible for intelligence about enemy positions near the Line of Control. The Kargil operation in 1999 was primarily the responsibility of the 8 Mountain Division, the formation that was rushed there after the intrusions were detected in May 1999. 56 Mountain Brigade deployed two battalions to contain intrusions in Mashkoh and Dras while the third battalion (18 Grenadiers) established the crucial firm base 1000 feet below Tololing at 15,000 feet. 8 Mountain Div was tasked to clear nearly 50 pockets of intrusions in Mashkoh. Of the 16 battalions involved in the war, only 10 were employed at Kargil. The 8 Mountain Division played a major role in evicting intrusions and defeating the Pakistan army at Kargil. It switched in 1990 from a counterinsurgency division in the North-East to the Srinagar valley and now to a high altitude mountain division at Kargil.

XVI Corps is believed to be one of the largest corps in the world as it consists of five divisions.

As of mid-1999 there were two divisions, comprising approximately 15,000 soldiers each, manning the LoC and the Line of Actual Control with China from Kargil to Siachen. While the 8 Mountain Division had been given sole charge of guarding 150 kilometers of the border in the Kargil sector, the 3 Infantry Division was in charge of Siachen and the Aksai Chin border. Significantly, as the 15 Corps mobilised its forces for the counterattack and elements of the 18 Mountain Division poured into the various sectors of Kargil, the people of Jammu & Kashmir were steadfast against the enemy forces.

With the induction of 14 Corps into Ladakh, the supply-load on the Army Service Corps (ASC) has increased tremendously. Given the politico-military situation on India's borders, a large portion of the army is deployed in some of the most inhospitable terrain. As of early 2002 these units had been joined by Central Command's I Corps Strike Force consisting of three divisions.

The Indian Army announced the creation of its new command known as South Western Command with its headquarters at Jaipur, which formally came into being on 18 April 2005. the South-Western Command, will operate in conjunction with the Udhampur-based Northern Command and Chandimandir-based Western Command. The reallocation of forces to the South-Western Command from Northern Command and Western Command was not immediately apparent.

For an effective operational preparedness in the western sector, in mid-2005 Indian Army raised a new corps at Yol Cantt in Kangra Valley of Himachal Pradesh. The new corps, christened 9 Corps, comprises 26 and 29 Infantry Divisions, which had previously been allocated to XVI Corps / Nagrota Corps, and a number of brigades.

Politics
Udhampur District has three assembly constituencies namely Udhampur, Chenani and Ramnagar.

See also
Talwara (Udhampur district)

References

External links
http://udhampur.nic.in

 
Districts of Jammu and Kashmir